A multi-domestic strategy is a strategy by which companies try to achieve maximum local responsiveness by customizing both their product offering and marketing strategy to match different national conditions. Production, marketing, and R&D activities tend to be established in each major national market where business is done.

An alternate use of the term describes the organization of multi-national firms.  International or multinational companies gain economies of scale through shared overhead, and market similar products in multiple countries.  Multi-domestic companies have separate headquarters in different countries, thereby attaining more localized management, but at the higher cost of forgoing the economies of scale from cost sharing and centralization.

References

Marketing strategy